Polykarpi (before 1926: Λίτσιστα - Litsista) is a village in Kastoria Regional Unit, Macedonia, Greece.

The Greek census (1920) recorded 585 people in the village and in 1923 there were 250 inhabitants (or 20 families) who were Muslim. Following the Greek-Turkish population exchange, in 1926 within Litsista there were 26 refugee families from Asia Minor and 5 refugee families from an unidentified location. The Greek census (1928) recorded 585 village inhabitants. There were 31 refugee families (140 people) in 1928.

References

Populated places in Kastoria (regional unit)